Edeet Ravel is an Israeli-Canadian novelist who lives in Montreal, Quebec, Canada.

Background
Edeet Ravel is a Canadian-Israeli writer who was born in 1955 in Sasa, an Israeli  kibbutz near the Lebanese border. Her family relocated to Montreal when she was seven. At age 18 she returned to Israel to attend Hebrew University where she received a B.A. and M.A. in English Literature. She returned to Montreal to complete an M.A. and Ph.D in Jewish Studies at McGill University and a Masters in Creative Writing at Concordia University. She subsequently taught at McGill, Concordia and John Abbott College.

Bibliography

 1995 Lovers: A Midrash
 2003 Ten Thousand Lovers
 2004 Look for Me
 2005 A Wall of Light
 2007 The Thrilling Life of Pauline de Lammermoor
 2007 The Mysterious Adventures of Pauline Bovary
 2007 The Secret Journey of Pauline Siddhartha
 2008 The Saver
 2008 Your Sad Eyes and Unforgettable Mouth
 2011 Held
 2011 The Last Rain
 2012 The Cat
 2017 A Boy Is Not a Bird
 2020 A Boy Is Not a Ghost

Awards

 Norma Epstein National Fiction Award (Lovers A Midrash)
 Governor General's Award Finalist (Ten Thousand Lovers)
 Koret Jewish Book Award Finalist (Ten Thousand Lovers)
 Quebec Writers Federation Award Finalist (Ten Thousand Lovers)
 Hugh MacLennan Prize for Fiction (Look For Me)
 Scotiabank Giller Prize Finalist (A Wall of Light)
 Canada & The Caribbean Commonwealth Writers' Prize Finalist (A Wall of Light)
 Canadian Jewish Book Award (A Wall of Light)
 J.I. Segal Award (A Wall of Light)
 Canadian Children's Bookclub Choice (Pauline Series, The Saver)
 2012 Popular Paperback for Young Adults, ALA (Held)
 Best Bets List, Ontario Library Association (Held)
 YA Top Forty Fiction Titles, Pennsylvania School Librarians Association (Held)
 Best Books for Kids & Teens 2012, Canadian Children's Book Centre (Held)
 Next Generation Indie Book Award finalist (Held)
 Young Adult Book of the Year finalist, Canadian Library Association (Held)
 Arthur Ellis Award finalist (Held)
 John Spray Mystery Award finalist (Held)
 Snow Willow Award 2012 (Held)
 Evergreen Award nominee 2014 (The Cat)
 Canadian Jewish Literary Award (A Boy Is Not a Bird)
 Silver Birch Award finalist (A Boy Is Not a Bird)
 Vine Award for Canadian Jewish Literature finalist (A Boy Is Not a Bird)
 Junior Library Guild Book Club Selection (A Boy Is Not a Bird)
 AJL Sydney Taylor Book Award Notable Book (A Boy Is Not a Ghost)
 Governor General's Award Finalist (A Boy Is Not a Ghost)

References

General
 Haaretz, Mar 14, 2003 "Torture in the Bedroom" by Yitzhak Laor
 Quill and Quire, April 2003 "The Thousand Lovers" by Mary Soderstorm
 Globe and Mail, Sept. 29, 2005
 Le Monde, Dec 16, 2005 "Amoureuse en Guerre" by Emilie Grangeray
 Globe and Mail, Mar 31, 2007 "A Child's Garden of Reading" by Susan Perren
 Canadian Literature, Autumn 2007 (194), "Beyond the Balagan" by Adrienne Kertzer
 Toronto Star, Oct. 7, 2007

External links
 Official website of Edeet Ravel

21st-century Canadian novelists
Jewish Canadian writers
Canadian women novelists
Living people
1955 births
Israeli emigrants to Canada
Israeli Jews
Israeli novelists
Israeli women writers
Hebrew University of Jerusalem alumni
Writers from Montreal
McGill University alumni
Concordia University alumni
21st-century Canadian women writers